Heinrich Gustav Flörke (24 December 1764, in Altenkalden in Mecklenburg – 11 June 1835) was a German botanist and lichenologist. 

He initially studied theology and mathematics in Bützow, later studying medicine at the University of Jena. In 1816 he succeeded Ludolph Christian Treviranus (1779–1864) as professor of natural history at the University of Rostock, where he remained for the rest of his life.

He specialized in the field of lichenology, being known for his investigations of the genus Cladonia. During his career, he was highly critical of Swedish botanist Erik Acharius's work; e.g. Kritische Anmerkungen zu den Becherflechten in der Lichenographia universalis des Herrn Doctors und Ritters Erik Acharius (1810) - (Critical comments on the cup lichen in Lichenographia universalis of Erik Acharius).

For a number of years Flörke was an editor of "Oekonomische Encyklopädie", an encyclopedia initiated by Johann Georg Krünitz (1728–1796). His name is associated with the wildflower genus Floerkea, and also the lichen species Cladonia floerkeana.

Selected writings 
 Beschreibung der deutschen staubflechten, 1807
 Deutsche Lichenen gesammelt und mit Ammerkungen, 1815
 De Cladoniis : difficillimo lichenum genere, commentatio nova, 1828.

See also
 :Category:Taxa named by Heinrich Gustav Flörke

References 

1764 births
1835 deaths
Academic staff of the University of Rostock
University of Jena alumni
19th-century German botanists
German lichenologists
18th-century German botanists